Cobalt-60 (60Co) is a synthetic radioactive isotope of cobalt with a half-life of 5.2713 years. It is produced artificially in nuclear reactors. Deliberate industrial production depends on neutron activation of bulk samples of the monoisotopic and mononuclidic cobalt isotope . Measurable quantities are also produced as a by-product of typical nuclear power plant operation and may be detected externally when leaks occur. In the latter case (in the absence of added cobalt) the incidentally produced  is largely the result of multiple stages of neutron activation of iron isotopes in the reactor's steel structures via the creation of its  precursor. The activated nickel nucleus emits two gamma rays with energies of 1.17 and 1.33 MeV, hence the overall equation of the nuclear reaction (activation and decay) is:

 + n →  →  + e− +  + gamma rays.

Activity
The absorbed dose constant is related to the decay energy and time. For  it is equal to 0.35 mSv/(GBq h) at one meter from the source. This allows calculation of the equivalent dose, which depends on distance and activity.

For example, a  source with an activity of 2.8 GBq, which is equivalent to 60 μg of pure , generates a dose of 1 mSv at one meter distance within one hour. The swallowing of  reduces the distance to a few millimeters, and the same dose is achieved within seconds.

Test sources, such as those used for school experiments, have an activity of <100 kBq. Devices for nondestructive material testing use sources with activities of 1 TBq and more.

Decay

The main β-decay transitions are shown. The probability for population of the middle energy level of 2.1 MeV by β-decay is 0.0022%, with a maximum energy of 665.26 keV. Energy transfers between the three levels generate six different gamma-ray frequencies. In the diagram the two important ones are marked. Internal conversion energies are well below the main energy levels.

Applications

The β-decay energy is low and easily shielded; however, the gamma-ray emission lines have energies around 1.3 MeV, and are highly penetrating. The physical properties of cobalt such as resistance to bulk oxidation and low solubility in water give some advantages in safety in the case of a containment breach over some other gamma sources such as caesium-137.
 As a tracer for cobalt in chemical reactions
 Sterilization of medical equipment.
 Radiation source for medical radiotherapy.  Cobalt therapy, using beams of gamma rays from  teletherapy machines to treat cancer. 
 Radiation source for industrial radiography.
 Radiation source for leveling devices and thickness gauges.
 Radiation source for pest insect sterilization.
 As a radiation source for food irradiation and blood irradiation.

Cobalt has been discussed as a "salting" element to add to nuclear weapons, to produce a cobalt bomb, an extremely "dirty" weapon which would contaminate large areas with    nuclear fallout, rendering them uninhabitable. When the bomb exploded, the excess neutrons from the nuclear fission would irradiate the cobalt and transmute it into . No country is known to have done any serious development of this type of weapon.

Production
There is no natural  in existence on earth; thus, synthetic  is created by bombarding a  target with a slow neutron source. Californium-252, moderated through water, can be used for this purpose, as can the neutron flux in a nuclear reactor. The CANDU reactors can be used to activate , by substituting the control rods with cobalt rods. In the United States, it is now being produced in a BWR at Hope Creek Nuclear Generating Station. The cobalt targets are substituted here for a small number of fuel assemblies. Still, over 40% of all single-use medical devices are sterilized using  from Bruce nuclear generating station.
 + n →

Safety
The remainder is taken up by tissues, mainly the liver, kidneys, and bones, where the prolonged exposure to gamma radiation can cause cancer. Over time, the absorbed cobalt is eliminated in urine.

Steel contamination
Cobalt is an element used to make steel.

Circa 1983, construction was finished of 1700 apartments in Taiwan which were built with steel contaminated with cobalt-60. Approximately 10,000 people occupied these buildings during a 9–20 year period. On average, these people unknowingly received a radiation dose of 0.4 Sv. This large group did not suffer a higher incidence of cancer mortality, as the linear no-threshold model would predict, but suffered a lower cancer mortality than the general Taiwan public. These observations appear to be compatible with the radiation hormesis model.

In August 2012, Petco recalled several models of steel pet food bowls after US Customs and Border Protection determined that they were emitting low levels of radiation. The source of the radiation was determined to be  that had contaminated the steel.

Incidents involving medical radiation sources
A radioactive contamination incident occurred in 1984 in Ciudad Juárez, Mexico, originating from a radiation therapy unit illegally purchased by a private medical company and subsequently dismantled for lack of personnel to operate it. The radioactive material, ended up in a junkyard, where it was sold to foundries that inadvertently smelted it with other metals and produced about 6,000 tons of contaminated rebar. These were distributed in 17 Mexican states and several cities in the United States. It is estimated that 4,000 people were exposed to radiation as a result of this incident.

In the Samut Prakan radiation accident in 2000, a disused radiotherapy head containing a  source was stored at an unsecured location in Bangkok, Thailand and then accidentally sold to scrap collectors. Unaware of the dangers, a junkyard employee dismantled the head and extracted the source, which remained unprotected for a period of days at the junkyard. Ten people, including the scrap collectors and workers at the junkyard, were exposed to high levels of radiation and became ill. Three of the junkyard workers subsequently died as a result of their exposure, which was estimated to be over 6 Gy. Afterward, the source was safely recovered by Thai authorities.

In December 2013, a truck carrying a disused 111 TBq 60Co teletherapy source from a hospital in Tijuana to a radioactive waste storage center was hijacked at a gas station near Mexico City. The truck was soon recovered, but the thieves had removed the source from its shielding. It was found intact in a nearby field. Despite early reports with lurid headlines asserting that the thieves were "likely doomed", the radiation sickness was mild enough that the suspects were quickly released to police custody, and no one is known to have died from the incident.

Parity

In 1957, Chien-Shiung Wu et al.  discovered the β-decay process violated parity, implying nature has a handedness.

In the Wu experiment her group aligned radioactive  nuclei by cooling the source to low temperatures in a magnetic field. Wu's observation was that more β-rays were emitted in the opposite direction to the nuclear spin.  This asymmetry violates parity conservation.

Suppliers
Both Argentina and Canada have (as of 2022) an all heavy water reactor fleet for power generation. Canada has the CANDU in numerous locations throughout Ontario as well as Point Lepreau Nuclear Generating Station in New Brunswick, while Argentina has two German supplied heavy water reactors at Atucha nuclear power plant and a Canadian-built CANDU at Embalse Nuclear Power Station. Heavy water reactors are particularly well suited for the production of cobalt-60 because of their excellent neutron economy and because their capacity for online refueling allows targets to be inserted into the reactor core and removed after a predetermined time without the need for cold shutdown. Furthermore, the heavy water used as a moderator is commonly held at lower temperatures than the coolant in light water reactors, allowing for a lower speed of neutrons, which increases the neutron cross section and decreases unwanted (n,2n) "knockout" reactions.

See also
 Cobalt bomb
 Harold E. Johns

References

External links
 Cobalt-60, Centers for Disease Control and Prevention.
 NLM Hazardous Substances Databank – Cobalt, Radioactive
 Beta decay of Cobalt-60, HyperPhysics, Georgia State University.
 

Isotopes of cobalt
Radioactive contamination